The Baku–Batumi pipeline is the name given to several pipelines and pipeline projects to transport kerosene and crude oil from the Caspian region to the Georgian Batumi oil terminal at the Black Sea. When first constructed in 1906, it was the world's longest kerosene pipeline.

Kerosene pipeline
Together with oil developments in the Baku area, the need for construction of the oil pipeline from Baku to the Black Sea rose. In 1877–78, Herbert W. C. Tweddle, an American oil engineer and chemist, and Konstantin Bodisko, an official of the Russian Ministry of Finance, proposed four options for the Caspian–Black Sea oil pipelines. The pipeline proposal was submitted also by Russian mining engineer and industrialist Ivan Ilimov in 1878. In 1880, Dmitri Mendeleev proposed the construction of Baku–Batum pipeline to ensure the transportation of Baku oil to the world market.

The idea got momentum in 1883, after opening the South Caucasus Railway. In 1884, the chief engineer Vladimir Shukhov of an engineering company Bari, Sytenko & Co. published a draft and estimate of the Baku–Batum oil pipeline. Also the pipeline technical project was later designed by Shukhov.  In 1885, Ivan Ilimov established the Caspian and Black Sea Oil Pipeline company. The concession to establish the Society of the Caspian–Black Sea Oil Pipeline was granted to Ilimov in December 1887. However, the proposed financial scheme was not accepted and in 1891 the pipeline construction was postponed as premature. 

In 1886, a group of Baku industrialists asked for permission to construct their own Trans-Caucasian pipeline. The idea was backed by Azerbaijani industrialist Zeynalabdin Taghiyev who wrote a letter to Prince Alexander Mikhailovich Dondukov-Korsakov, the governor of the Caucasus. Local businessmen led by Aghabala Quliyev set up a joint-stock company for the pipeline construction. However, the government decision to proceed was adopted only in 1893.

On 23 May 1896, the State Council of Russia adopted a decision to construct the pipeline along the Trans-Caucasian Railway and preparatory works started at the same year. At the first stage, the Batum–Mikhailovo (Khashuri) section was constructed, while the construction of Baku–Mikhailovo (Khashuri) section was finished only in 1906. The official opening took place on 24 July 1907 in Tiflisi (Tbilisi).

The pipes were produced at plants in Mariupol, Sosnovitsy, and Yekaterinoslav (now: Dnipro). The initial pipeline capacity was 980,000 tons of kerosene per annum. Pumping stations were equipped with plunger pumps of Worthington Corporation, driven by steam and diesel engines. The pipeline for its time was the longest pipeline in the world.

After the Bolshevik Revolution, kerosene deliveries through the pipeline were relaunched in March 1921 and on 20 May 1921, the first delivery of kerosene arrived at Batum. After 1936 Batum was renamed to Batumi. In 1925, the kerosene pipeline was refitted as an oil pipeline.

Crude oil pipeline
The project of new pipeline (second line) was proposed in 1924. In 1925, the Soviet Union held negotiations with French companies to set up a joint venture to construct and operate the Baku–Batum crude oil pipeline. The intention was to use the pipeline for oil export to Europe, mainly to France. However, the negotiations failed as also failed negotiations with the United States companies. In 1927, the construction of the pipeline was awarded to Azneft, an Azerbaijani oil company. The project designer and construction manager was A.V. Bulgakov.

The construction started in May 1928 and the pipeline was opened on 30 April 1930. It supplied mainly Batum's refinery.

The pipeline had 13 pumping stations each equipped with three diesel pumps of 360 hp. The pipeline used over 60,000 German-manufactured pipes weighing a total of over 54,000 tons. Diesels for the pipeline were purchased from MAN AG, pumps from Crossley and generators from Theodor Bergmann.

Construction work was done on three sections simultaneously. The pipeline cost 49 million rubles.

The pipeline was incapable of transporting oil in planned amount and the capacity was needed to increase by 750,000 tons.  In August 1942, the pipeline was dismantled in connection with the threat of penetration of German troops in that direction and its pipes were used for the construction of the Astrakhan–Saratov pipeline. In 1990s, some part of the pipeline were used for the construction of the Baku–Supsa Pipeline.

Proposed new pipelines
There have been several proposals for the new Baku–Batumi pipeline. In 1994–1998, the Baku–Supsa Pipeline, which partly uses old Baku–Batum pipeline route, was constructed. On 2 March 1998, Chevron Corporation agreed to reconstruct existing Khashuri–Batumi pipeline and construct Dubandi (Baku)–Khashuri pipeline.  However, in May 2001 Chevron canceled this project and started to ship its oil from Tengiz Field through the CPC pipeline.

Kazakhstan's national oil company KazMunayGas, owner of the Batumi Oil Terminal, has shown interest to build the new Baku–Batumi pipeline, which together with proposed Trans-Caspian and Batumi–Constanţa connections would allow to supply KazMunayGas oil refineries in Romania (Rompetrol) and planned refinery in Batumi.

See also

 Energy in Georgia (country)

References

Oil pipelines in Azerbaijan
Oil pipelines in Georgia (country)
Caspian Sea
History of the petroleum industry
Batumi
Oil pipelines in the Soviet Union
Azerbaijan–Georgia (country) relations
Black Sea energy